The 1928–29 New York Rangers season was the franchise's third season. During the regular season, the Rangers finished in second place in the American Division with a 21–13–10 record and qualified for the Stanley Cup playoffs. In the postseason, the Rangers won series against the New York Americans and Toronto Maple Leafs to reach the Stanley Cup Finals, where they lost to the Boston Bruins 2–0.

Regular season

Final standings

Record vs. opponents

Schedule and results

|- align="center" bgcolor="#CCFFCC"
| 1 || 15 || @ Detroit Cougars || 2–0 || 1–0–0
|- align="center" bgcolor="white"
| 2 || 18 || @ New York Americans || 1 – 1 OT || 1–0–1
|- align="center" bgcolor="#FFBBBB"
| 3 || 20 || Montreal Maroons || 1–0 || 1–1–1
|- align="center" bgcolor="#CCFFCC"
| 4 || 22 || @ Chicago Black Hawks || 2–1 || 2–1–1
|- align="center" bgcolor="#CCFFCC"
| 5 || 25 || Pittsburgh Pirates || 2–0 || 3–1–1
|- align="center" bgcolor="#CCFFCC"
| 6 || 29 || Chicago Black Hawks || 2 – 1 OT || 4–1–1
|-

|- align="center" bgcolor="#FFBBBB"
| 7 || 1 || @ Montreal Maroons || 3–0 || 4–2–1
|- align="center" bgcolor="#FFBBBB"
| 8 || 4 || @ Boston Bruins || 2–0 || 4–3–1
|- align="center" bgcolor="white"
| 9 || 6 || @ Pittsburgh Pirates || 0 – 0 OT || 4–3–2
|- align="center" bgcolor="white"
| 10 || 9 || @ Detroit Cougars || 2 – 2 OT || 4–3–3
|- align="center" bgcolor="#CCFFCC"
| 11 || 11 || Toronto Maple Leafs || 3–2 || 5–3–3
|- align="center" bgcolor="#CCFFCC"
| 12 || 13 || @ Montreal Canadiens || 3 – 2 OT || 6–3–3
|- align="center" bgcolor="#CCFFCC"
| 13 || 16 || Detroit Cougars || 3–0 || 7–3–3
|- align="center" bgcolor="#CCFFCC"
| 14 || 20 || Ottawa Senators || 1–0 || 8–3–3
|- align="center" bgcolor="#FFBBBB"
| 15 || 25 || New York Americans || 1–0 || 8–4–3
|- align="center" bgcolor="#CCFFCC"
| 16 || 30 || Boston Bruins || 2–0 || 9–4–3
|-

|- align="center" bgcolor="#CCFFCC"
| 17 || 1 || @ Toronto Maple Leafs || 3–2 || 10–4–3
|- align="center" bgcolor="white"
| 18 || 3 || Pittsburgh Pirates || 2 – 2 OT || 10–4–4
|- align="center" bgcolor="white"
| 19 || 6 || @ New York Americans || 0 – 0 OT || 10–4–5
|- align="center" bgcolor="#CCFFCC"
| 20 || 10 || @ Ottawa Senators || 9–3 || 11–4–5
|- align="center" bgcolor="#CCFFCC"
| 21 || 13 || Detroit Cougars || 1–0 || 12–4–5
|- align="center" bgcolor="#FFBBBB"
| 22 || 15 || @ Boston Bruins || 4–1 || 12–5–5
|- align="center" bgcolor="#CCFFCC"
| 23 || 17 || Chicago Black Hawks || 1–0 || 13–5–5
|- align="center" bgcolor="white"
| 24 || 19 || @ Montreal Canadiens || 0 – 0 OT || 13–5–6
|- align="center" bgcolor="#FFBBBB"
| 25 || 20 || Montreal Canadiens || 1–0 || 13–6–6
|- align="center" bgcolor="#CCFFCC"
| 26 || 22 || Toronto Maple Leafs || 1–0 || 14–6–6
|- align="center" bgcolor="#CCFFCC"
| 27 || 24 || @ Pittsburgh Pirates || 3–1 || 15–6–6
|- align="center" bgcolor="#FFBBBB"
| 28 || 27 || Boston Bruins || 2–1 || 15–7–6
|- align="center" bgcolor="#CCFFCC"
| 29 || 31 || New York Americans || 2–1 || 16–7–6
|-

|- align="center" bgcolor="#CCFFCC"
| 30 || 3 || @ Chicago Black Hawks || 3–2 || 17–7–6
|- align="center" bgcolor="white"
| 31 || 5 || Montreal Maroons || 1 – 1 OT || 17–7–7
|- align="center" bgcolor="#FFBBBB"
| 32 || 7 || @ Ottawa Senators || 2–1 || 17–8–7
|- align="center" bgcolor="white"
| 33 || 10 || Montreal Canadiens || 3 – 3 OT || 17–8–8
|- align="center" bgcolor="#FFBBBB"
| 34 || 14 || @ Toronto Maple Leafs || 3–1 || 17–9–8
|- align="center" bgcolor="#CCFFCC"
| 35 || 17 || Pittsburgh Pirates || 2–1 || 18–9–8
|- align="center" bgcolor="#FFBBBB"
| 36 || 21 || Detroit Cougars || 1–0 || 18–10–8
|- align="center" bgcolor="#FFBBBB"
| 37 || 23 || @ Montreal Maroons || 9–1 || 18–11–8
|- align="center" bgcolor="#CCFFCC"
| 38 || 26 || Ottawa Senators || 2–0 || 19–11–8
|- align="center" bgcolor="white"
| 39 || 28 || @ Chicago Black Hawks || 0 – 0 OT || 19–11–9
|-

|- align="center" bgcolor="#CCFFCC"
| 40 || 3 || @ Detroit Cougars || 3–2 || 20–11–9
|- align="center" bgcolor="#FFBBBB"
| 41 || 5 || @ Boston Bruins || 2–1 || 20–12–9
|- align="center" bgcolor="#FFBBBB"
| 42 || 10 || Boston Bruins || 3–2 || 20–13–9
|- align="center" bgcolor="white"
| 43 || 14 || Chicago Black Hawks || 1 – 1 OT || 20–13–10
|- align="center" bgcolor="#CCFFCC"
| 44 || 17 || @ Pittsburgh Pirates || 4–3 || 21–13–10
|-

Playoffs

The playoffs were now between division finishers of each division, rather than a division champion from each division.

Key:  Win  Loss

Player statistics
Skaters

Goaltenders

Goaltenders

†Denotes player spent time with another team before joining Rangers. Stats reflect time with Rangers only.
‡Traded mid-season. Stats reflect time with Rangers only.

References

New York Rangers seasons
New York Rangers
New York Rangers
New York Rangers
New York Rangers
Madison Square Garden
1920s in Manhattan